Chos Malal is a department located in the north of Neuquén Province, Argentina.

Geography
The Department limits with Chile at the North, Mendoza Province at the northeast, Pehuenches Department at southeast, Ñorquín Department at southwest and Minas Department at west.

Departments of Neuquén Province